John Trelawny (or Trelawney) (died 14 October 1568), of Pool in Menheniot, Cornwall, was an English landowner. The son of another John Trelawny of Pool, who had been a co-heir of the Earl of Devon, he was the head of one of Cornwall's leading families.  He was also High Sheriff of Cornwall in 1561 and 1567, and a Deputy Lieutenant, and was paid the sum of £6 for not taking the order of knighthood.

Trelawny died in 1568. He had married Anne Reskymer. His eldest son, John (died 1569), was an infant when he inherited his father's estate and lived only a few months afterwards, but the inheritance passed to a second son, Jonathan (later Sir Jonathan, 1568–1604), born after his father's death. His widow was remarried to William Mohun.

References

 Arthur Collins, The English Baronetage, Volume 2 (London: Thomas Wotton, 1741) 
 Burke's Peerage and Baronetage (London: Henry Colburn & Richard Bentley, 1832) 
 Vivian's Visitations of Cornwall (Exeter: William Pollard & Co, 1887) 
 Richard Polwhele and John Whitaker, The Civil and Military History of Cornwall  (London: Cadell & Davies, 1806)

Year of birth missing
1568 deaths
People from Cornwall
16th-century English people
High Sheriffs of Cornwall